This is a list of Purdue Boilermakers football players in the NFL Draft.

Key

Selections

Notes
Mel Gray and Eric Jordan were part of the 1984 NFL Supplemental Draft.

References

Purdue

Purdue Boilermakers NFL Draft